Steve Cohn is a lawyer and a Democratic District Leader in Brooklyn, New York. He is a Democratic Committeeman in Brooklyn's 50th Assembly District. Cohn said in 2010 that he would not seek reelection as Democratic District Leader, after 27 years in the position.

Background and family
Cohn, an Orthodox Jew, grew up in Williamsburg, Brooklyn, son of a judge who was also a Greenpoint and Williamsburg assemblyman from 1959 to 1968.  His mother Lillian died in 1995.

Career
Cohn was a law clerk for a Brooklyn judge, counsel to the two Brooklyn district council members from the district, and a part-time staff member on two Brooklyn Assembly subcommittees.  Cohn has strong ties with the Williamsburg Hasidic community.

Cohn was a Democratic state committeeman for nearly 20 years, and an executive secretary of the Kings County Democratic Party, the oldest Democratic organization in the U.S. He is also a former president of the Brooklyn Bar Association.

In 2002, Cohn came in second in both the Democratic primary vote and the general election (as a Liberal) for Councilman for District 33 in Brooklyn, which runs from Brooklyn Heights to Greenpoint.  Cohn raised $311,059 for his run for the seat.

References

Living people
People from Williamsburg, Brooklyn
Lawyers from New York City
American Orthodox Jews
Politicians from Brooklyn
New York (state) Democrats
Year of birth missing (living people)